Acacia filicifolia, commonly known as fern-leaved wattle, is a plant in the legume family, Fabaceae and is native to eastern Australia. It is a shrub or tree with compound leaves resembling fern fronds, and spherical heads of yellow or bright yellow flowers from autumn to late spring. It is a common and widespread species, especially on the coast and tablelands of New South Wales.

Description
The smaller branches are more or less cylindrical with fine, longitudinal ridges.

The pods are more or less flat and straight-sided.

Taxonomy and naming
Acacia filicifolia was first formally described in 1932 by Edwin Cheel and Marcus Baldwin Welch but they did not nominate a type specimen. The description was published in the Journal and Proceedings of the Royal Society of New South Wales. The specific epithet (filicifolia) is derived from the Latin words filix meaning "fern" and folium meaning "a leaf" referring to the similarity of the leaves of this wattle to the fronds of some species of fern.

Distribution and habitat
Fern-leaved wattle grows in forest in sandy soil, often in gullies and creeks from south-eastern Queensland to Batemans Bay in southern New South Wales. It is mostly found on the coast and nearby tablelands.

References

filicifolia
Fabales of Australia
Flora of New South Wales
Flora of Queensland
Plants described in 1932